White Pepper is the seventh studio album by the American rock band Ween, and the last album they would release on Elektra Records. It was released on May 2, 2000.

Promotion
The band helped promote the album by performing "Exactly Where I'm At" on the Late Show with David Letterman. The track "Even If You Don't" was made into a music video and directed by Trey Parker and Matt Stone of South Park fame. According to Dean Ween (Mickey Melchiondo), he and Gene Ween (Aaron Freeman) are good friends of Parker and Stone, and Freeman has referred to them as "kindred spirits."

"Stay Forever" was written for cellist Tanya Haden.

Singles
 "Even If You Don't" was released as a single on Mushroom Records with the B-side "Cornbread Red".
 "Stay Forever" was released as a single on Mushroom Records with "The Grobe" and "Who Dat?". "Who Dat?" was also included in the Japanese version of the album.

Legacy
White Pepper was included on Creative Loafings list of the 101 best albums of the 2000s, while Glide magazine named it the 12th best album of the decade. Magnet included it at #15 on their list of the 60 best albums released between 1993 and 2003, and the album was included in the book 1,000 Recordings to Hear Before You Die in 2008. Jake Shears of Scissor Sisters named it one of his favorite albums of all time, stating: "I love the stew of what they do – they can be whimsical, they can be heavy – they're just incredible musicians and songwriters. To me, White Pepper is an amazing snapshot and a great collection of songs. They're kind of like Beck – they've always delivered – and also some of it is just so fucking juvenile."

In 2020, Stereogums Nate Rogers wrote a piece on the album for its 20th anniversary. He attributed the initial lukewarm reception of the album to its lack of profanity and increased accessibility, suggesting that it may have alienated much of the band's hardcore fans. "It's much easier to appreciate White Pepper now that we know it did not lead to a final form in which Ween were just edge-less and overglossed" he wrote, "The band never gave in to the powers that be. They never stopped being artists who deferred to the playful will of their mighty Demon God Boognish while also writing frequently — if not perpetually — fantastic music."

Track listing
All songs written by Ween. Published by Warner-Tamerlane Publishing Corp./Ver Music/Browndog Music, BMI.

Personnel
 Chris Shaw – producer, engineer, mixer
 Danny Madorsky – assistant engineer
 Phil Painson – assistant engineer
 Damian Shannon – assistant engineer
 Kirk Miller – live sound engineer
 Ween – producer
 Howie Weinberg – mastering
 Gregory Burke – art direction
 Danny Clinch – photography

Charts

References

2000 albums
Ween albums
Elektra Records albums